Durbin may refer to:

People
Durbin (surname), people with the surname
First name
 Durbin Feeling (1946-2020), American Cherokee linguist
 Durbin Feltman (born 1997), American baseball player
 Durbin Ward (1819–1886), American lawyer, politician, newspaper publisher, and Civil War soldier

Places
United States
Durbin, Indiana, unincorporated community
Durbin, Kentucky, an unincorporated community 
Durbin, North Dakota, an unincorporated community 
Durbin, Ohio, an unincorporated community 
Durbin, West Virginia, a town

Mathematics / Statistics
 Durbin test, a nonparametric test for balanced incomplete designs
 Durbin–Watson statistic, a test statistic
 Durbin–Wu–Hausman test, a statistical hypothesis test in econometrics

Other
 Durbin amendment, a provision of United States federal law that limits fees charged to retailers for debit card processing
 Durbin and Greenbrier Valley Railroad, an American heritage and freight railroad in Virginia and West Virginia
 Durbin Hotel, a historic hotel building located in Rushville, Indiana

See also
Durban, a city in South Africa